Yohoghany is an unincorporated community in Westmoreland County, in the U.S. state of Pennsylvania.

History
Yohoghany is a Native American name purported to mean "a stream flowing in a roundabout course".

References

Unincorporated communities in Pennsylvania
Unincorporated communities in Westmoreland County, Pennsylvania